Brødrene Hartmann A/S is the world’s leading manufacturer of moulded-fibre egg packaging, a market-leading manufacturer of fruit packaging in South America and India and the world’s largest manufacturer of technology for the production of moulded-fibre packaging.

Hartmann has 15 factories in Europe and Israel, North and South America, India and Russia.

History
Brødrene Hartmann A/S was founded in 1917 by Louis, Carl and Gunnar Hartmann.  The three brothers inherited their father's paper bag plant in Kongens Lyngby.  By 1936, Brødrene Hartmann was producing moulded fibre packaging products in Denmark.

The company's group revenue increased to DKK 2,744 million in 2021. Operating profit was DKK 250 million corresponding to a profit margin of 9.2%. Investments increased to DKK 542 million.

Corporate governance

Board of Directors
Jan Klarskov Henriksen, Chairman
Steen Parsholt, Vice Chairman
Jan Madsen, Board Member
Marianne Schelde, Board Member
Danny Fleischer, Employee Elected
Palle Skade Andersen, Employee Elected

Executive Board
Torben Rosenkrantz-Theil, CEO
Flemming Steen, CFO

References

External links
Brødrene Hartmann
 Headquarters (Denmark): 

Companies based in Gentofte Municipality
Packaging companies of Denmark
Pulp and paper companies of Denmark
Multinational companies
Danish companies established in 1917
Manufacturing companies established in 1917